Klaipėda County is one of ten counties in Lithuania, bordering Tauragė County to the southeast, Telšiai County to the northeast, Kurzeme in Latvia to the north, and Kaliningrad Oblast in Russia to the south. To the west is the Baltic Sea. It lies in the west of the country and is the only county to have a coastline and not landlocked.  Its capital is Klaipėda. On 1 July 2010, the county administration was abolished, and since that date, Klaipėda County remains as the territorial and statistical unit.

Geography

The topography of Klaipėda County is divided into three regions, the highest in the east and lowest in the west: the Western Zemaičiai Plateau in the east, the Western Zemaičiai Plain in the center, and the Pajurys Lowland in the west and on the Baltic coast.

Klaipėda County borders Kaliningrad Oblast, Russia, to the south via the Nemunas, which drains into the Curonian Lagoon. The Curonian Spit, a UNESCO World Heritage Site, is split between Klaipėda County, Lithuania and Kaliningrad Oblast, Russia. The Lithuanian side of the spit is separated from mainland Lithuania via a small opening between Klaipėda and Smiltynė where the Curonian Lagoon drains into the Baltic Sea.

Skuodas district is the source of the Šventoji, which flows north into Courland, Latvia, back down into Klaipeda County before draining into the Baltic Sea at the coastal settlement of Šventoji.

Climate
Being the only county on Lithuania's Baltic coast, Klaipėda County is distinguished by its maritime climate. There is little variation in mean daily temperature. On average, winters are relatively warmer and summers are relatively cooler than the rest of Lithuania. Storms and foggy spells are frequent in winter. In locations throughout the county, annual precipitation rates can reach as high as 876 mm per year.

Municipalities
Municipalities are:

Demographics
As of 2020, Klaipėda County's population was 319,958. Approximately 69% is urban, while the remaining 30% are rural. It is the third most populous county in Lithuania.

Gender
As of 2020, approximately 52% of people are female and 47% are male.

Ethnic groups
The ethnic composition in 2001 was:
 Lithuanians 84.2%
 Russians 11.4%
 Ukrainians 1.3%
 Belarusians 1.0%
 Poles 0.3%
 Other 1.8%

References

External links
Social and demographic characteristics of Klaipėda County
Economy of Klaipėda County
Environment of Klaipėda County

 
Counties of Lithuania